The 1991 Virginia Slims Championships were held at the Madison Square Gardens in New York City, United States between November 18 and November 24.

Finals

Singles

 Monica Seles defeated  Martina Navratilova 6–4, 3–6, 7–5, 6–0

Doubles

 Martina Navratilova /  Pam Shriver defeated  Gigi Fernández /  Jana Novotná 4–6, 7–5, 6–4

Notes

References

External links
 
 ITF tournament edition details
 Tournament draws

WTA Tour Championships
WTA Tour Championships
WTA Tour Championships
WTA Tour Championships
1990s in Manhattan
WTA Tour Championships
Madison Square Garden
Sports competitions in New York City
Sports in Manhattan
Tennis tournaments in New York City